Stenostola ferrea is a species of beetle in the family Cerambycidae. It was described by Schrank in 1776, originally under the genus Cerambyx. It has a wide distribution throughout Europe. It feeds on Juglans regia.

Subspecies
 Stenostola ferrea maculipennis Holzschuh, 1982
 Stenostola ferrea ferrea (Schrank, 1776)

References

Saperdini
Beetles described in 1776
Taxa named by Franz von Paula Schrank